Volae is a brand of recumbent bicycles manufactured by Volae which is based in Stevens Point, Wisconsin, United States. Rolf Garthus founded the company in 2003. All models are built in the United States - a range of steel-framed bicycles are built by Waterford Precision Cycles, of Waterford Wisconsin, and the carbon fiber frames are built by Calfee Design in La Selva Beach California.  Purchasing is done through the Hostel Shoppe in Stevens Point.

Models
 Venture (Tandem)
 Venture Pro (Tandem)
 Team Carbon
 Club Carbon
 Expedition (dual 26" wheels)
 Expedition Pro (dual 26" wheels)
 Tour (26"/20" wheels)
 Century (26"/20" wheels)
 Voyageur ES (26"/20" wheels, or dual 26" wheels), comes apart for easy transport

References

See also
List of bicycle manufacturers

Cycle manufacturers of the United States
Bicycles
Manufacturing companies based in Wisconsin